The 1970 Federation Cup was the eighth edition of what is now known as the Fed Cup. 22 nations participated in the tournament, which was held at the Freiburg Tennis Club in Freiburg, West Germany from 19–24 May. Australia defeated West Germany in the final.

Participating teams

Draw
All ties were played at the Freiburg Tennis Club in Freiburg, West Germany on clay courts.

First round
Belgium vs. Switzerland

France vs. Japan

Netherlands vs. Greece

Canada vs. Norway

Second round
United States vs. Yugoslavia

West Germany vs. Switzerland

Italy vs. France

Netherlands vs. Canada

New Zealand vs. Great Britain

Indonesia vs. Sweden

Czechoslovakia vs. Australia

Quarterfinals
United States vs. South Africa

West Germany vs. France

Netherlands vs. Great Britain

Sweden vs. Australia

Semifinals
United States vs. West Germany

Great Britain vs. Australia

Final
West Germany vs. Australia

Consolation round

Draw

First round
Canada vs. Greece

Quarterfinals
Japan vs. New Zealand

Yugoslavia vs. Switzerland

Semifinals
Japan vs. Norway

Belgium vs. Switzerland

Final
Japan vs. Switzerland

References

Billie Jean King Cups by year
Federation Cup
Federation Cup
Federation Cup
Federation Cup
Federation Cup
Federation Cup
German